Dieter Happ (born 11 May 1970) is an Austrian snowboarder. He competed in the men's giant slalom event at the 1998 Winter Olympics.

References

1970 births
Living people
Austrian male snowboarders
Olympic snowboarders of Austria
Snowboarders at the 1998 Winter Olympics
Sportspeople from Innsbruck